Wang Yong (born 16 March 1968) is a Chinese weightlifter. He competed in the men's lightweight event at the 1992 Summer Olympics.

References

1968 births
Living people
Chinese male weightlifters
Olympic weightlifters of China
Weightlifters at the 1992 Summer Olympics
Place of birth missing (living people)
20th-century Chinese people